Gerardo Alfredo Bruna Blanco (born 29 January 1991) is an Argentine professional footballer who plays as a midfielder for NIFL Premiership side Dungannon Swifts.

He was on the books of Real Madrid and Liverpool as a teenager but never made a senior appearance for either club. He has spent most of his career in the lower leagues of England and Spain, moving frequently.

Born in Argentina and raised in Spain, Bruna first represented Spain at a youth international level, before switching to represent his native Argentina.

Club career

Youth career
Bruna spent five years in the youth set-up at Real Madrid from 2002 to 2007.

In the summer of 2007 Bruna moved to England to sign for Liverpool, having been offered and turned down a professional contract by Real Madrid.

"My father agreed with me that moving here would be a great opportunity. I already knew about Liverpool from the Champions League, the final we won and the final we lost. These games, as well as the Chelsea semi-finals, made a big impression on me." A left-footer with a talent for set pieces, he learnt his trade with the reserves, helping them to win the Premier Reserve League in 2007–08.

Blackpool
Bruna joined Championship side Blackpool on a two-year deal, with an option for a further 12 months, on 17 July 2011. He made his competitive debut as a substitute in the League Cup defeat to Sheffield Wednesday on 11 August 2011. He made his Football League debut in a 2–1 defeat at home to Nottingham Forest on 22 October, coming on as a late substitute.

With four total appearances to his name, Bruna was released by Blackpool on 9 May 2013.

Huesca
On 20 September 2013 Bruna joined SD Huesca, freshly relegated to Segunda División B. He played 17 games for the Aragonese club, scoring one goal.

Tranmere Rovers
Bruna played in a number of pre-season friendlies for League Two club Tranmere Rovers in the summer of 2014, before picking up an injury.  He was then offered a one-month contract by the club. He made his only appearance for the club as a substitute in a league cup match but was not offered a long term contract.

Whitehawk
Bruna signed a one-month contract with Whitehawk, who then played in England's 6th tier, with the option to extend by the club depending on performances. The signing of Bruna was described as a "massive coup" as Bruna had previously played for clubs such as Real Madrid and Liverpool. Bruna scored his first goal for Whitehawk in a 5–1 victory over Chelmsford City.

Accrington Stanley
In January 2015, Bruna joined League Two club Accrington Stanley. He scored his first goal for the club in a 2-1 loss to Bury in the Football League Trophy on 1 September 2015. On 18 January 2016, Bruna signed a pre-contract with Canadian club Ottawa Fury which would have him depart at the end of the season.

Ottawa Fury
On 15 February 2016, Bruna was released by Accrington, allowing him to join the Fury in time for the start of training camp. He played a few matches for their academy team in the third-tier Première Ligue de soccer du Québec.

Derry City
On 5 February 2019, Bruna signed with League of Ireland Premier Division side Derry City. On 4 December 2020, Bruna announced his departure from the club after two seasons.

Shelbourne
In February 2021, Bruna signed for Shelbourne ahead of their first season back in the League of Ireland First Division having been relegated 3 months previously. He suffered an Anterior cruciate ligament injury before the season started, keeping him out of action for a long term spell which kept him out of action for the entire season meaning he never played a competitive game for the club.

Dungannon Swifts
In September 2022, he signed for NIFL Premiership club Dungannon Swifts.

International career
Bruna has represented both Argentina and Spain at youth level. In May 2008 he was a member of the Spain under-17 squad European Under-17 Football Championship in Turkey. He made one appearance in the group stages as a second-half substitute in a 3–3 draw with France at the Mardan Sports Complex, Aksu, Antalya. Bruna represented the Argentina national under-20 football team at the 2009 Toulon tournament.

Personal life
His wife is from Liverpool.

Career statistics

References

External links

1991 births
Living people
Association football midfielders
Argentine footballers
Spanish footballers
Sportspeople from Mendoza, Argentina
Argentine emigrants to Spain
Argentine expatriate footballers
Expatriate footballers in Spain
Argentine expatriate sportspeople in Spain
Expatriate footballers in England
Argentine expatriate sportspeople in England
Expatriate soccer players in Canada
Argentine expatriate sportspeople in Canada
Expatriate association footballers in Northern Ireland
Liverpool F.C. players
Blackpool F.C. players
SD Huesca footballers
Tranmere Rovers F.C. players
Whitehawk F.C. players
Accrington Stanley F.C. players
Ottawa Fury FC players
Derry City F.C. players
Shelbourne F.C. players
Dungannon Swifts F.C. players
English Football League players
National League (English football) players
Segunda División B players
North American Soccer League players
USL Championship players
League of Ireland players
NIFL Premiership players
Argentina youth international footballers
Spain youth international footballers